Minuscule 660 (in the Gregory-Aland numbering), ε 178 (von Soden), is a Greek minuscule manuscript of the New Testament, on parchment. Palaeographically it has been assigned to the 12th century. The manuscript is lacunose. Scrivener labelled it by 638e.

Description 

The codex contains the text of the New Testament, on 341 parchment leaves (size ) with only one lacuna (John 6:60-8:59). Lacuna in John 6:60-8:59 was supplemented by a later hand.

The text is written in one column per page, 21 lines per page, in very small letters.

The text of the four Gospels is divided also into much smaller sections, the Ammonian Sections (in Mark 237 sections – the last numbered section in 16:15). The manuscript contains also the lectionary markings at the margin, and numerous pictures (among them portraits of the Evangelists).

Text 

The Greek text of the codex is a representative of the Byzantine text-type. Hermann von Soden classified it as Iota text. Kurt Aland placed it in Category V.

According to the Claremont Profile Method it belongs to the textual group 22a. It belongs to subgroup 35.

It is close textually to the codices: Tischendorfianus IV, Guelferbytanus A, Guelferbytanus B, Nitriensis, 047, 0130, 4, 251, 273, 440, 472, 485, 495, 716, 1047, 1093, 1170, 1229, 1242, 1295, 1355, 1365, 1396, 1515, 1604. Hermann von Soden designated this group by I'.

History 

Scrivener dated it to the 11th or 12th century, Gregory to the 11th century. Currently the manuscript is dated by the INTF to the 12th century.

The manuscript was bought in Constantinople in 1882.

The manuscript was added to the list of New Testament manuscripts by Scrivener in the third edition of his A Plain Introduction... in 1883.
Gregory saw the manuscript in 1887.

Currently the manuscript is housed at the Berlin State Library (Graec. quarto 66), in Berlin.

See also 

 List of New Testament minuscules
 Biblical manuscript
 Textual criticism

References

Further reading 

 

Greek New Testament minuscules
11th-century biblical manuscripts